Butler Township, Ohio, may refer to:

Butler Township, Columbiana County, Ohio
Butler Township, Darke County, Ohio
Butler Township, Knox County, Ohio
Butler Township, Mercer County, Ohio
Butler Township, Montgomery County, Ohio
Butler Township, Richland County, Ohio

Ohio township disambiguation pages